Springwell is a suburb of the city of Sunderland. Not to be confused with the village of the same name in the city's far west, Springwell is 2 miles from the city centre to the area's southwest. The suburb borders Thorney Close, The Barnes and Plains Farm. Built in the 1940s, Springwell originated as one of a series of post-war council housing estates in the area.

History
Originally known as "Springwell Farm Estate", Springwell was the first post-war housing estate to be created in Sunderland, being completed on May 25, 1946.

References

City of Sunderland suburbs